Alessandro Pedroni (born 30 January 1971) is a retired Italian professional football player who played as a defender.

1971 births
Living people
Italian footballers
Serie A players
Serie B players
U.S. Cremonese players
Treviso F.B.C. 1993 players
Vastese Calcio 1902 players
Inter Milan players
Torino F.C. players
A.C. Monza players
S.S.D. Varese Calcio players
Calcio Lecco 1912 players
U.S. Pergolettese 1932 players
Association football defenders